Tan Tao Group is a leading industrial park and infrastructure developer in Vietnam, specializing in industrial parks development, land development, infrastructure and power development, and telecom and network development.
Tan Tao Group's key subsidiary, Tan Tao Investment & Industry Corp (“ITACO”), is the first privately managed and leading industrial park developer in Vietnam.  ITACO is the first private industrial park developer listed on the Ho Chi Minh Stock Exchange (Stock Code: ITA).  ITACO is one of 9 leading companies in Vietnam included into the Russell Vietnam Index 10  and one of 10 companies with the largest market capitalization and highest liquidity included into S&P Vietnam 10 Index. According to the 2011 ranking of Vietnam's top 1000 companies with the highest corporate income tax contribution conducted by the Vietnam Report Company in coordination with VietnamNet and Tax magazine of the General Department of Taxation, Tan Tao Investment & Industry Corporation is ranked 129th  and 35th  among Vietnam's top 200 private companies with the highest corporate income tax contribution.

History
Tan Tao Group was established in 1993 in Ho Chi Minh City originally as Hoang Yen Limited Liability Company. Since its inception, Madam Dang Thi Hoang Yen has served as the group's chairwoman of the board.

Businesses
Tan Tao Group 's major subsidiaries include:
 Tan Tao Investment and Industry Corporation (ITACO)
 Tan Duc Investment Corporation
 ITA Water Corporation
 Saigon - Mekong City Investment Corporation
 Tan Tao Services Utilization – Office and Warehousing Trade Corporation (TASERCO)
 Tan Tao Energy Development Corporation (TEDC)
 Tan Tao Energy Corporation (TEC)
 Southern Engineering Informatics Investment Corporation (S.E.I)
 ITA-ways Corporation
 Tan Tao Freight Forwarding and Warehousing Corporation - ITA Trans Corporation
 Tan Tao Cement Corporation
 Tan Tao Urban Development and Investment Corporation
 ITA Telecommunication Corporation
 Vietnam Broadcasting Corporation (VBC)- website: www.vbc.com.vn.
 RealTV Corporation - website:www.realtv.com.vn
 Tan Tao University - website: www.ttu.edu.vn

Investments
Since its initial operation in 1996, the Group has developed several large-scale industrial parks in Vietnam. For industrial parks, the Group provides ancillary services to tenants such as waste treatment services, security services, utilities and telecommunications services. 
Industrial Parks
 Tan Tao Industrial Park: is located in the Binh Tan District of Ho Chi Minh City and is approximately 12 km from the Ho Chi Minh City centre and 12 km from the Tan Son Nhat International Airport. 
 Tan Duc Industrial Park: is located in the Duc Hoa District of Long An Province and is approximately 26 km from Ho Chi Minh City, 28 km from the Tan Son Nhat International Airport and 29 km from the Saigon Port.
 Infrastructure
Nam Du Deep Water Seaport: The project with total investment capital of $800 million would be implemented in two phases: In the first phase, the seaport will have total yearly designed capacity of 12 million tonnes of coal and five million tonnes of goods. In addition, the port will be able to receive 80,000 dwt carriers. In the second phase, the seaport's designed capacity will be raised to 50 million tonnes of coal, 12 million tonnes of goods per year as well as having capacity to welcome 150,000-200,000 dwt.
 Tan Tao University (TTU): It is the first Vietnam–American University that is accredited on US Education standards that will enable its scholars to spend their 3rd year in the US.  Graduates from TTU can also be admitted to post-graduate programs internationally.
 Energy Development
 
The Group has been developing Kien Luong thermal power complex with an aggregate capacity of 4,400-5200 MW in Kien Luong province  in the South of Vietnam and several hydro projects which will represent over 10% of the country's installed capacity by 2020. The Complex comprises three coal-fired power plants (Phase I: 1,200 MW, Phase II: 1,200-2,000 MW, and Phase III: 2,000 MW). The Complex is planned to be one of the largest power generation complexes in the country meeting the power requirement of the Southern Vietnam.

Charity activities
On September 30, 2007, Tan Tao Group launched three Foundations: ITA Scholarship, ITA Medical Aid and ITA Veterans Assistance with the attendance  of President Nguyen Minh Triet. Since  Tan Tao Group funded a total of 21 billion dong through three Foundations and hopes to continually assist the community in meeting their basic needs. Tan Tao Group hopes to encourage other corporations to join in its efforts in bettering the human lives in Vietnam.

 ITA-Scholarship: This foundation gives scholarships to poor but talented students. Aid is also given to teachers in need, encouraging them to teach in remote, rural areas.
 ITA Medical Aid: This foundation supports victims of Agent Orange and patients in need of financial assistance.
 ITA Veterans Assistance: This foundation aids victims of war. Survivors of war including the Federation of the Vietnamese Mothers, injured veterans as well as victims of natural disasters.
 Hoa Trang Nguyen Prize: It was established in 2008 by the Tan Tao Group in coordination with the Ministry of Education and Training, the Party Central Committee's Commission for Popularization and Education, Ho Chi Minh Communist Youth Union Central Committee, and the Vietnam Association of non-state universities and colleges. The prize aims to annually honor students with the best performance in high schools, or with first national prize, international medals and highest scores in national university entrance exams.

References

External links
Tan Tao Group homepage

Construction and civil engineering companies of Vietnam
Construction and civil engineering companies established in 1996
Vietnamese companies established in 1996